Order of battle Peiking – Suiyuan Railway Operation refers to the troops involved in the 1937 Peiking – Suiyuan Railway Operation.

Order 
China

Taiyuan Pacification Headquarters – Yen Hsi – shan,[1] 
 1st Cavalry Army (temporarily attached) – Chao Cheng-shou
 1st Cavalry Division – Pen Yu-pin
 2nd Cavalry Division – Sun Chang-sheng
 New 2nd Cavalry Brigade – Shih Yu-shan
 218th Inf. Bde – Tung Chi-wu
 New 3rd Inf. Bde – Ching The-chuan
 New 5th Inf. Bde – An Yung-chang
 New 6th Inf. Bde – Wang Tse-hsiu
 6th Cavalry Division – Liu Tan-fu
 7th Cavalry Division – Men Ping-yueh
 7th Group Army – Fu Tso-yi
 7th Group Army Temporary Group – Fu Tso-yi (concurrent)
 72nd Division – Chen Chang-chieh
 7th Separate Brigade - Ma Yen-shou
 200th Brigade - Liu Tan - fu
 211th Brigade - Sun Lan-feng
 7th Army Group Detachment - Liu Ju-ming (7th Army Deputy)
 143rd Division - Liu Ju-ming (concurrent)
 27th Separate Brigade - Liu Ju-chen (withdrawn from Peiping)
 Chahar Peace Preservation Brigade
 Chahar Peace Preservation Brigade
 Frontline Group – Tang En-po
 13th Army – Tang En-po (concurrent)
 4th Division – Wan Wang – ling +
 89th Division – Wang Chung-lien +
 17th Army – Kao Kuei-tse
 21st Division – Li Hsien - chou
 84th Division – Kao Kuei – tse (concurrent)

1st Army Region – Chiang Kai-shek
 14th Group Army - Wei Li Huang
 85th Division – Chen Tieh
 14th Army – Li mo-yen
 10th Division – Li mo-yen (concurrent) +
 83rd Division – Liu Kan +

Notes
 + Reorganized Divisions without German training.

See also
 Operation Chahar

References

 [1] Hsu Long-hsuen and Chang Ming-kai, History of The Sino-Japanese War (1937–1945) 2nd Ed., 1971. Translated by Wen Ha-hsiung, Chung Wu Publishing; 33, 140th Lane, Tung-hwa Street, Taipei, Taiwan Republic of China.
 [2] Jowett, Phillip S., Rays of The Rising Sun, Armed Forces of Japan's Asian Allies 1931-45, Volume I: China & Manchuria, 2004. Helion & Co. Ltd., 26 Willow Rd., Solihull, West Midlands, England.

Peiking – Suiyuan Railway
Peiking – Suiyuan Railway